Simone Mori (born 23 April 1972, in Pontremoli) is an Italian former professional racing cyclist.

Career highlights

External links
 

1972 births
Living people
Italian male cyclists
Italian track cyclists
Sportspeople from the Province of Massa-Carrara
Cyclists from Tuscany
21st-century Italian people